Aghcheh Mashhad-e Char Dowli (also Romanized as Āghcheh Mashhad-e Chār Dowlī; also known as Āghcheh Mashhad and Āghcheh Mashhad-e Chahār Dowlī) is a village in Gavdul-e Sharqi Rural District, in the Central District of Malekan County, East Azerbaijan Province, Iran. At the 2006 census, its population was 72, in 20 families.

References 

Populated places in Malekan County